Edgar Miles Bronfman Jr. (born May 16, 1955) is an American businessman who currently serves as a Managing Partner at Accretive LLC, a private equity firm focused on creating and investing in technology companies. He previously served as CEO of Warner Music Group from 2004 to 2011 and as Chairman of Warner Music Group from 2011 to 2012. In May 2011, the sale of WMG was announced; Bronfman would continue as CEO in the transaction. In August 2011, he became Chairman of the company as Stephen Cooper became CEO. Bronfman previously served as CEO of Seagram and vice-chairman of Vivendi Universal. Bronfman Jr. expanded and later divested ownership of the Seagram Company, and also worked as a Broadway and film producer, and songwriter under the pseudonyms Junior Miles and Sam Roman.

Early life 
Born in 1955, Edgar Jr. ("Efer" to friends)  is the son of Edgar Miles Bronfman and the grandson of Samuel Bronfman, patriarch of one of the wealthiest and most influential Jewish families in Canada. The Bronfman family gained its fortunes through the Seagram Company, an alcohol distilling company. Edgar Jr. is the second of five children of Ann (Loeb) and Edgar Miles Bronfman. His mother was the daughter of John Langeloth Loeb Sr. (a Wall Street investment banker whose company was a predecessor of Shearson Lehman/American Express) and Frances Lehman (a scion of the Lehman Brothers banking firm). They divorced in 1973.

Business career

Film production
Bronfman proceeded to a brief career in entertainment in the 1970s as a film and Broadway producer. The summer before his final year of high school, in 1972, he was a credited producer on the film, The Blockhouse. His Efer Productions company was signed by Universal Studios in 1977 to a three-year movie production contract. He produced the unsuccessful film The Border  (1982), which starred Jack Nicholson.

Seagram Company
In 1982, Bronfman returned to the Seagram Company, spending three months learning the ropes before moving to London to become managing director of Seagram Europe. In 1984, Bronfman returned to New York as President of the House of Seagram, the company's U.S. marketing division. By 1994, he became the Chief Executive Officer, where he began a move away from the traditional liquor business and into entertainment. According to Cigar Aficionado, Edgar Jr. led the family on a series of disastrous business deals, ultimately losing the family's ownership of Seagram.

The first step in this diversification was the widely criticised sale of Seagram's stake in DuPont. In 1981, Edgar Bronfman Sr. had sold Seagram's stake in Conoco to DuPont, in exchange for almost 25% of the chemical giant. This stake in DuPont, by 1995, represented about 70% of Seagram's total earnings. Nevertheless, Bronfman Jr., acting as Seagram CEO, approached DuPont about buying back its shares, a deal that DuPont wasted no time in closing.

With the proceeds of the $9 billion sale, Bronfman Jr. went on an expansion into the entertainment business, in music through the acquisition of PolyGram, and in film entertainment through MCA and Universal Pictures. However, the new entertainment conglomerate he created had a brief life, before needing a strategic partner. Bronfman Jr., then led Seagram into a controversial all-stock acquisition by French conglomerate Vivendi in 2000. Bronfman Jr., became chief of the new company, Vivendi Universal, but the Seagram company effectively lost control of its entertainment businesses. Meanwhile, the beverage division—the core of Seagram was acquired by Pernod Ricard and Diageo and divided between the two firms. Seagram, for all intents and purposes, ceased to exist.

In December 2001, Bronfman announced he was stepping down from an executive capacity at Vivendi Universal, but remaining as vice chair of the board.

In 2002, Bronfman joined private investment firm Accretive LLC as General Partner. The firm focuses on conducting deep market research and hand-selecting firms to back. Among its past projects are Accretive Health and Fandango (ticket service). Companies it currently backs include human resources firm AlphaStaff and small-business insurance company Insureon.

Warner Music Group
On February 27, 2004, Bronfman finalised the acquisition of Warner Music Group and served as Chairman and CEO of the music company for the following 7 years. Bronfman helped to transform WMG by rapidly growing the company's digital music sales, redefining the relationships it has with artists and diversifying its revenue streams through its expansion into growing areas of the music business. WMG held an initial public offering of stock in 2005 (NYSE: WMG), and is now the only standalone major music company to be publicly traded. While the stock has fallen from a high in 2005 of over $30 per share, the company has nonetheless produced double-digit growth in its digital business, increased its market share and delivered stable revenue performance despite a drastic music industry decline during the same period. In 2008, The New York Times reported that WMG's Atlantic Records became the first major record label to generate more than half of its music sales in the U.S. from digital products.

In May, 2011, WMG and Bronfman announced the company's sale to Access Industries for US$3.3 billion cash. Access is controlled by Russian-born billionaire Len Blavatnik, a former board member and still-substantial shareholder of WMG at the time of the purchase announcement. The sale, coming after a three-month bidding process, "serves the best interests of stockholders as well as the best interests of music fans, our recording artists and songwriters, and the wonderful people of this company," according to a statement released by Bronfman. CEO Bronfman would continue in his post in the transaction, though further job cuts were also foreseen. The investment group which has owned the company since 2004 was said to have received a positive return on its investment.

In August 2011, Bronfman became Chairman of Warner Music and Stephen Cooper became CEO. He stepped down as Chairman on January 31, 2012. In February 2017, it was reported that Meredith Corp. and a group of investors led by Bronfman Jr. were considering pursuing Time Inc.

He is currently the chairman of Endeavor, an international non-profit development organisation that supports entrepreneurs.

Waverley Capital
In 2017, it was announced that Bronfman would be launching a new venture capital firm called Waverley Capital, alongside Luminari Capital founder Daniel Leff. This firm would invest in "innovative and disruptive" companies within both technology and entertainment, with offices in New York and Palo Alto, California, with a Los Angeles office expected to open in the future.

Music career
In 1973, Bronfman began a songwriting career under the pseudonyms Junior Miles and Sam Roman. He often collaborated with Bruce Roberts on songs like "Whisper in the Dark", which he gave to Dionne Warwick to record in thanks for introducing him to his first wife, Sherry. Bronfman also co-wrote  "To Love You More", which was recorded by Celine Dion, and Barbra Streisand's "If I Didn't Love You".

Personal life 
Edgar M. Bronfman, Jr., is the son of Edgar Bronfman, Sr., the billionaire businessman and longtime president of the World Jewish Congress who died aged 84 in 2013. He is the half-brother of Clare Bronfman, who as a 39-year-old was charged in 2018 in a NXIVM sex-trafficking case.

In 1979, Bronfman married his first wife, the African American actress Sherry Brewer, in New Orleans. Bronfman's father did not approve of the marriage. "I very much wanted for him to end the relationship, because I told him, all marriages are difficult enough without the added stress of totally different backgrounds", Bronfman Sr. wrote in his memoirs. "Sherry offered to convert [to Judaism], which though well intentioned, was not the point."

Bronfman and Brewer eloped and he and his father remained estranged. The couple had three children before they divorced in 1991:
 Benjamin (born 1982) – Bronfman's eldest son with Sherry is also known as "Ben Brewer", a rock musician. Brewer was the guitar player and vocalist for the New York-based alternative rock band The Exit. He also was engaged to Mathangi "Maya" Arulpragasam, a British recording artist, songwriter, painter and director of Sri Lankan Tamil descent, better known under the stage name of M.I.A. Her compositions combine elements of electronica, dance, alternative, hip hop and world music. They have a son, Ikhyd Edgar Arular Bronfman, born on 11 February 2009.
 Vanessa, and
 Hannah (born 1987) – Actress and DJ. Hannah is probably best known for Beautified, an app for setting last-minute beauty appointments.

In 1993 Bronfman married Clarisa Alcock San Román, a Catholic, the daughter of Frank Alcock Pérez-Matos, a Venezuelan oil executive of half British descent, and Dinorah San Román Strup. They have four children: Aaron, Bettina, Erik, and Clarissa.

Insider trading conviction 
On January 21, 2011, Bronfman was found guilty in French court of insider trading as Vivendi chief and received a 15-month suspended sentence and a €5m fine.

Considering the jail sentences handed out to other executives for similar convictions, BNN reporter Michael Kane told CTV News "The fact that the judge suspended the jail time could be looked at as getting off lightly, perhaps."

He has appealed the decision.

Stance on music copyright infringement 
At the height of file sharing service Napster's popularity, Bronfman was a leading opponent of the illegal use of peer-to-peer technology. As CEO of Universal, he helped lead the music industry's opposition to Napster, likening it to slavery and Soviet communism.

In 2006, WMG was the first major media company to create a business model around user-generated content and, more recently, has been pushing for ways to monetise the popularity of P2P networks on college campuses.

In late 2006 in an interview with Reuters, Bronfman caused a stir by admitting that his children have copyright infringing music. He claims to have delivered punishment for this but wants it to remain within the realm of the family.

Lately, Bronfman may have revised his judgement. During the GSMA Mobile Asia Congress, he told the audience that mobile operators should not make the same mistakes that the music industry has:

In 2010 Bronfman changed his philosophy on the music industry's online business models, stating that he does not support free advertising supported models. He said that WMG will focus on promoting services that require payment, that will appeal to the population that already pays for downloads in stores such as iTunes.

References

Further reading 
 McQueen, Rod. The Icarus Factor: The Rise and Fall of Edgar Bronfman Jr., 2004. 
 Faith, Nicholas. The Bronfmans: The Rise and Fall of the House of Seagram, 2006.

External links 
 Edgar Bronfman Jr.'s biography at WMG Corporate Site
 Official page for Bronfman's book about Judaism in America
 Speaking at Stanford
 "Edgar Bronfman Jr." at hollywood.com
 Milner, Brian. "The Unmaking of a Dynasty", Cigar Aficionado
 "Edgar Bronfman, Edgar Bronfman: Overrated father, misunderstood son", Slate, 26 April 1998, by David Plotz
 Edgar Bronfman Jr. biography at Directors of Endeavor
 
 The Bronfman family at The Canadian Encyclopedia

1955 births
Living people
American billionaires
American people of Jewish descent
American people of Russian-Jewish descent
American mass media owners
American music industry executives
Edgar Bronfman Jr.
Collegiate School (New York) alumni
Businesspeople from New York City
Seagram
American businesspeople convicted of crimes
American chairpersons of corporations
Lehman family
Carl M. Loeb family
NBCUniversal people
Universal Music Group